Geravian-e Sofla (also Romanized as Gerāvīān-e Soflá and Gerāveyān-e Soflá; also known as Gerāvīān-e Pā’īn) is a village in Howmeh Rural District, in the Central District of Gilan-e Gharb County, Kermanshah Province, Iran. At the 2006 census, its population was 320, in 73 families.

References 

Populated places in Gilan-e Gharb County